Canthigaster axiologus is a species of marine fish in the family Tetraodontidae.

Canthigaster axiologus, also known as the Pacific crown toby, is widespread throughout the tropical waters of the Indo/ West Pacific area, Red Sea included.

Canthigaster axiologus is a small sized fish that can reach a maximum size of 10.1 cm length.

References

External links

axiologus
Fish described in 1931